Alessandro Pepe (born 10 January 1972), better known as the "Fog Man", is an Italian FX Artist, currently working for DreamWorks Animation.

Pepe was born in Rome, but moved to Genoa in his childhood years.  His interest for Computer Graphics emerged early on, during his high school years, where he mastered rendering techniques on the Amiga platform.

Early career
After a few stints with local studios in Italy, Pepe eventually moved to Switzerland in 2001 and joined Amila Entertainment, where he focused on the creation of computer-generated animations for various commercials.  In 2006 Pepe moved back to Genoa and started a collaboration with Art Five Animation Studio, which led to the successful development of the Ceres Beer 2006 TV spot series, which was aired on all the major Italian television networks. This experience marked the turning point of Pepe's career.

Major projects
In August 2006 Pepe moved to Australia and joined Animal Logic, as Lighting Technical Director for Warner Bros.'s animated movie Happy Feet, which later won the 2006 Academy Award for Best Animated Feature.

From Australia, Pepe moved to London in early 2007, to join  CFC Framestore, as Rigging Technical Director.  In this role, Pepe's first project was New Line Cinema's movie The Golden Compass, which later won the 2007 Academy Award for Best Visual Effects. After The Golden Compass, he worked on The Dark Knight - which was nominated for 8 Academy Awards and eventually won two - and The Tale of Despereaux.

In the summer of 2008, Pepe joined DreamWorks Animation and moved to Los Angeles, where he currently lives and works. He has worked on Shrek Forever After, Kung Fu Panda 2, Puss in Boots, Rise of the Guardians and Turbo thereafter.

Industry insiders jokingly refer to Pepe as the "King Midas" of special effects, since several of the movies he worked on ended up winning an Academy Award.

References

External links
Official Website

DreamWorks SKG
CFC Framestore
Animal Logic
Art Five Animation Studio
Amila Entertainment

Articles
 

1972 births
DreamWorks Animation people
Living people
Film people from Genoa
Italian animators
Computer animation people